K. D. Santhanam was an Indian actor, writer and lyricist who worked mainly in Tamil films.

Career 
He was a teacher at Madurai Sri Mangala Bala Gana Sabha training young boys in dramatics. He was known as a strict disciplinarian. He punished erring boys beating them with a cane, sometimes chasing the running boys. One of his students became a renowned actor later who acknowledged to his friends that it was due to the discipline of his tutor he was able to reach heights. The actor is Sivaji Ganesan. Later Santhanam has done minor character roles in which Sivaji Ganesan featured as the hero. This information has been recorded by writer Aroordas in his biography.

As an actor 
He is a character artiste and has featured in more than 100 films.

In Pasamalar, he featured as Rajaratnam, a village senior who arranges the marriage of Sivaji Ganesan with M. N. Rajam.

"Ahaa Enna Porutham" is a hit song from the film Ragasiya Police 115. In between the verses one can hear a commanding voice asking "Ange ennamma saththam?" (What is the noise there?). The voice is of Santhanam, who featured as Dhanapal Muthaliar (a filmmaker), father of Neela (Jayalalithaa) in the film.

He featured as the father of M. G. Ramachandran in the film Aasai Mugam.

As a Lyricist 
During the 1950s, Tamil Cinema had a number of classic lyricists who enriched the films with their variety of songs. Udumalai Narayana Kavi and Pattukkottai Kalyanasundaram wrote leftist oriented songs. A. Maruthakasi specialised in agricultural songs. Ku. Ma. Balasubramaniam wrote melodious songs. Kannadasan wrote on life and philosophy. Thanjai N. Ramaiah Dass wrote songs that appealed to the common man. Santhanam made his mark by writing songs with rhythmic flow known in Tamil as Santham.

A classic example of his "santham" song is "Thamizh Maalai Thanai Chooduvaal" from the film Ambikapathy. The sequence is: a poet takes up a challenge thrown by the King to sing 100 songs without referring to earthly pleasures, in order to win his daughter, the princess. Practically, in a film, it is impossible to sing 100 songs at a stretch. Santhanam wrote five songs for this scene. It was shown on screen using the running notation method. The fifth song becomes the 99th song. The poet gets excited. He sings the last five lines of the last verse in one breath. The word flow was such that it made the audience spellbound. This song is said to be the stamp song of Santhanam.

Music director Ilaiyaraaja once said that he got the inspiration for his song "Vaa Vennilla" from the film Mella Thirandhathu Kadhavu (1986) was a song written by Santhanam – "Vaan Meedhile Inba Thaen Maari Peyudhe" from the film Chandirani (1953).

His dance song "Laalu Laalu", written for the film Vijayakumari (1950) was rendered by Vyjayanthimala and became popular.

There are many noteworthy songs written by K. D. Santhanam.

Filmography 

Actor and Lyricist

Script writer 
Chinna Durai (1952)

References

Bibliography

External links 

Indian male film actors
Male actors in Tamil cinema
Indian lyricists
Tamil film poets
Possibly living people
Year of birth missing (living people)